"Hard Knock Life (Ghetto Anthem)" is a single from American rapper Jay-Z's third album Vol. 2... Hard Knock Life, released on October 27, 1998. It features a pitch-modified sample of the song "It's the Hard Knock Life" from the 1977 musical Annie. The song was produced by The 45 King and at the time of its release was the most commercially successful Jay-Z single. The RIAA certified it as a gold single in March 1999, and it reached platinum status on July 15, 2015. In addition, it was nominated for Best Rap Solo Performance at the 41st Grammy Awards in 1999. The song peaked at number 15 on the Billboard Hot 100. Outside the United States, the song peaked within the top ten of the charts in Canada, Denmark, Germany, Netherlands, New Zealand, Norway, Ireland, Sweden, Switzerland, and United Kingdom, as well as the top twenty of the charts in Austria and Belgium.

Reception

Critical reception
Chuck Taylor of Billboard wrote, "Now this is a new twist. Instead of sampling an '80s pop staple à la Puff Daddy, rapper Jay -Z goes after a '70s Broadway show tune, in this case "Hard-Knock Life" from "Annie". The results will grab listeners and pin them to their radio speakers, if only to figure out just what's going on here. It's this kind of clever twist and original thinking that has the potential to expand the horizons of the genre, known in particular for running the retread trend ragged. Unfortunately, this is one of those rap records that, in order to find its place on radio, has to be edited and blanked to the point of distraction. Programmers will have to weigh the value of the novelty against wondering why the artist didn't just start over with a clean slate if he intended to hit the airwaves. Still, there's no resisting the unique flavor of this clever number, which has "hit" stamped all over it."

Commercial reception
While it peaked at number 15 on the Billboard Hot 100, "Hard Knock Life" was also Jay-Z's first single to achieve significant success outside the United States, peaking within the top ten of the charts in several countries, including Canada, Germany, and the United Kingdom. In the latter country, "Hard Knock Life" saw its biggest success, entering and peaking at number two on the UK Singles Chart in December 1998, stalling behind Britain's biggest-selling single of 1998, "Believe" by Cher, during its seventh consecutive week at the summit of the chart.

Music video
The music video for the song consists of Jay-Z performing outdoors in his native Brooklyn, New York. Dame Dash makes a cameo appearance in the video.

Impact and legacy
Slant Magazine listed "Hard Knock Life" at number 84 in their ranking of "The 100 Best Singles of the 1990s" in 2011, writing, "Jay-Z’s co-opting of a discordant, already famous showtune is a rare novel endeavor in a genre generally defined by following the leader; it’s pulled off so seamlessly that it’s easy to forget what a ballsy move it was. The transformation of the original’s piano base into a thumping organ creep sets the stage, but it’s undeniably Jay-Z, transparently showing off his executive command by fussing with the levels at the start, which makes the song. The source material and the resulting product may seem diametrically opposed, but they end up being fundamentally about the same thing: forming a common thread of struggles with poverty spun into gold."

VH1 placed it at number 11 on their list of "100 Greatest Songs of Hip-Hop".

Formats and track listings

UK CD
 "Hard Knock Life (Ghetto Anthem) (Radio Edit)"
 "Can't Knock The Hustle (Fools Paradise Remix)"
 "Hard Knock Life (Ghetto Anthem) (Album Version)"

Vinyl

A-side
 "Hard Knock Life (Ghetto Anthem) (swearing version)"
 "Hard Knock Life (Ghetto Anthem) (LP Version)"

B-side
 "Hard Knock Life (Ghetto Anthem) (Instrumental)"

Charts

Weekly charts

Year-end charts

Certifications

Usage in media
The song was parodied by Mike Myers as his character Dr. Evil in the 2002 movie Austin Powers in Goldmember.

Comedy rap trio Sudden Death parodied the song on their album Die Laughing (2005), titled "Star Trek Life".

References

External links
Recording Industry Association of America Gold & Platinum Searchable Database
 Samplin' Annie at Vibe

1998 singles
Def Jam Recordings singles
Jay-Z songs
Roc-A-Fella Records singles
Songs written by Jay-Z
Songs with music by Charles Strouse
Songs with lyrics by Martin Charnin